John Patrick Gorman (August 8, 1876 – July 3, 1963) was a Canadian politician. He represented the electoral district of Antigonish in the Nova Scotia House of Assembly from 1942 to 1949. He was a member of the Nova Scotia Liberal Party.

Born in 1876 at East Tracadie, Antigonish County, Nova Scotia, Gorman was a commercial traveler. He was educated at La Salle Academy, Halifax. Gorman married Margaret MacKinnon in 1907.

Gorman entered provincial politics in 1942, winning a byelection in the Antigonish riding following the death of John A. MacIsaac. Gorman was re-elected in the 1945 election. He did not reoffer in the 1949 election. Gorman died at Antigonish on July 3, 1963.

References

1876 births
1963 deaths
Nova Scotia Liberal Party MLAs
People from Antigonish County, Nova Scotia